Harold More Cooper (also Harold Moore Cooper, born 29 December 1886 in North Adelaide, South Australia, died 14 May 1970 in Glenelg, South Australia) was a radio operator, anthropologist and historian.

Cooper was the eldest son of Robert Cooper, an accountant, and his wife Mary Antill née Osborne. After his schooling and traveling to Europe, he worked until 1926 as a radio operator in a telegraph company. Privately, he ran an experimental amateur radio station at his home in Glenelg, South Australia, making worldwide contacts and participating in research on the effects of climate factors and solar turbulence on shortwave radio. He also operated a radio link between the Watheroo Magnetic Observatory in Western Australia and Washington DC in the United States.

From 1934 Cooper studied local Aboriginal historic sites with a special focus on sites at Hallett Cove and Kangaroo Island. In 1941 he was appointed assistant-ethnologist at the South Australian Museum. He was recognised by Norman Tindale, then curator of anthropology at the museum, for his work ensuring that the indigenous tools and artefacts were recognised as "the handiwork of the first Australians".

In 1957 he resigned from his position at the museum  but continued as honorary associate in anthropology until 1968. He died on 14 May 1970 at Glenelg and was buried in St Jude's Anglican churchyard, Brighton.

Notes

References

1886 births
1970 deaths
Australian ethnologists